Padarthi is a village in Prakasam District of Andhra Pradesh, India. According to the 2011 census it has a population of 4226 living in 8439 households.

References

Villages in Prakasam district